The letter Ʊ (minuscule: ʊ), called horseshoe or sometimes bucket, inverted omega or latin upsilon, is a letter of the International Phonetic Alphabet used to transcribe a near-close near-back rounded vowel. Graphically, the lower case is a turned small-capital Greek letter omega in many typefaces (e.g. Arial, Calibri, Candara, Liberation, Lucida, Noto, Times New Roman), and historically it derives from a small-capital Latin U (ᴜ), with the serifs exaggerated to make them more visible. However, Geoffrey Pullum interpreted it as an IPA variant of the Greek letter upsilon (υ) and called it Latin upsilon, the name that would be adopted by Unicode, though in IPA an actual Greek upsilon is also used for the voiced labiodental approximant; Pullum called this letter script V and Unicode calls it V with hook.

Horseshoe is used in the African reference alphabet, and national alphabets such as those of Anii and Tem. It most often has the value of /u/ with retracted tongue root.

Use on computers
The majuscule and the minuscule are located at U+01B1 and U+028A in Unicode, respectively.

See also
Mho (℧)

References

Latin-script letters